The 1852 United States presidential election in Florida took place on November 2, 1852, as part of the 1852 United States presidential election. Voters chose three representatives, or electors to the Electoral College, who voted for President and Vice President.

Results

Democrat Franklin Pierce defeated Whig Party candidate Winfield Scott by a margin of 20.06% or 1,443 votes. Pierce won all of Florida's 3 electoral votes and was the first Democrat to win the state.

Results by County

See also 

 1852 Florida gubernatorial election
 1852 United States House of Representatives election in Florida

References

1852
Florida
1852 Florida elections